The women's long jump event was, for the first time, part of the track and field athletics programme at the 1948 Summer Olympics. The competition was held on August 4, 1948.  The final was won by Hungarian Olga Gyarmati.

Records
Prior to the competition, the existing World record was as follows.

Since it was the first time this event took place, the following new Olympic record was set during this competition:

Schedule

All times are British Summer Time (UTC+1)

Results

Qualifying round

Qual. rule: qualification standard 5.30m (Q) or at least best 12 qualified (q).

Final standings

Key:  OR = Olympic record

References

External links
Organising Committee for the XIV Olympiad, The (1948). The Official Report of the Organising Committee for the XIV Olympiad. LA84 Foundation. Retrieved 4 September 2016.

Athletics at the 1948 Summer Olympics
Long jump at the Olympics
1948 in women's athletics
Ath